Orville Gene Maddox (August 23, 1938 – June 2, 2015) was an American politician and lawyer.

Born in Chillicothe, Illinois, Maddox graduated from Chillicothe High School in 1956. He then received his bachelor's degree from Northwestern University in 1960 and his law degree from Northwestern University School of Law in 1962. Maddox then moved to Des Moines, Iowa to practice law. In 1975, Maddox served on the Clive, Iowa City Council and then served as mayor of Clive, Iowa, from 1977 until 1992. Maddox was a Republican. From 1993 to 2003, Maddox served in the Iowa Senate and then served in the Iowa House of Representatives from 2003 to 2007. Maddox died in Des Moines, Iowa.

Notes

1938 births
2015 deaths
Politicians from Des Moines, Iowa
People from Chillicothe, Illinois
Northwestern University alumni
Northwestern University Pritzker School of Law alumni
Iowa lawyers
Iowa city council members
Mayors of places in Iowa
Republican Party Iowa state senators
Republican Party members of the Iowa House of Representatives
21st-century American politicians
20th-century American lawyers